Meriem is a character in Edgar Rice Burroughs's series of Tarzan novels, and the heroine of the fourth, The Son of Tarzan.

History
Born Jeanne Jacot, the daughter of French general Armand Jacot, Meriem is taken captive by Arabs as a child; they give her the name by which she is subsequently known. She is later rescued from her captors by Korak, son of Tarzan, with whom she afterwards lives in the jungle. She is beautiful, strong, athletic, brave, daring and sensitive. She will kill for food but not for sport. The emerging relationship between the two feral teenagers is described sensitively, as the embittered boy and the abused girl learn to live and love together, saving each other from various dangers and drawing to the happy ending in which Meriem marries Korak and is reunited with her father who reveals that she is a "princess in her own right".

Meriem is an example of the "Jungle Girl" archetype, in that she lives in the forest, dressed in skins and scavenging for food, with Korak as her guide and protector. Unlike others of the type, she has a past (she is a kidnap victim) and a future—as the wife of a junior English aristocrat and heir to an African chieftaincy. The tenth Tarzan book, Tarzan and the Ant Men, introduces her young son Jackie.

In Other Media
In the 1920 serial The Son of Tarzan, Meriem was portrayed by Mae Giraci as a young girl, and by Nita Martan as an adult.

The character has also appeared in the Tarzan newspaper strip and in comic books featuring Korak.

External links

 Text of The Son of Tarzan at Project Gutenberg

Tarzan characters
Literary characters introduced in 1916
Fantasy film characters
Jungle girls
Fictional French people
Fictional viscounts and viscountesses
Female characters in literature